Sir Edward Tyrrell (1551 – 29 January 1606) was an English politician who sat in the House of Commons from 1604 to 1606, as the Member of Parliament for Buckingham. He served as High Sheriff of Buckinghamshire from 1595–96.

Early life
Tyrrell was the son of George Tyrrell of Thornton, Buckinghamshire, and his wife Eleanor Montagu daughter of Sir Edward Montagu.   He inherited Thornton on the death of his father in 1571 and later built a house there called "The Toy". He may have matriculated at Trinity College, Cambridge in 1573.

Career
He was appointed High Sheriff of Buckinghamshire for 1595–96. He was knighted at the Charterhouse on 11 May 1603.

In 1604, Tyrrell was elected Member of Parliament for Buckingham. He died in office in 1606.

He died in 1606 and was buried in Thornton church.

Marriages and family
Tyrrell married firstly Mary Lee, daughter of Benedict Lee of Huncote Buckinghamshire and had two daughters and a son Edward who became a baronet.

He married secondly Margaret Egerton widow of Thomas Egerton and daughter of Thomas Aston of Aston, Cheshire. Their children included:
 Timothy Tyrrell (died 1632), who was Master of the Buckhounds to Prince Henry and Charles I
 John Tyrrell
 Thomas Tyrrell
 Penelope Tyrrell
 Frances Tyrrell, a maid of honour to Princess Elizabeth, who married Edward Broughton of Marchwiel
 Theodosia Tyrrell, who married Edward West of Marsworth
 Phillipa Tyrrell, who married John Nourse of Woodeaton
 Bridget Tyrrell, who married the author William Sanderson.

References

 

1551 births
1606 deaths
English MPs 1604–1611
High Sheriffs of Buckinghamshire
Knights Bachelor
Alumni of Trinity College, Cambridge